The 1979 Milwaukee Brewers season involved the Brewers' finishing second in the American League East with a record of 95 wins and 66 losses. They scored at least one run in each of their first 160 games of the season, and were shutout (losing 5-0 to Minnesota) only in the 161st game which was to be their last game of the season.

Offseason 
 December 21, 1978: Steve Lake was purchased from the Orioles by the Milwaukee Brewers.
 February 26, 1979: Eduardo Rodríguez was purchased from the Brewers by the Kansas City Royals.
 March 6, 1979: Vic Harris was signed as a free agent by the Brewers.
 March 28, 1979: Gary Beare was traded by the Brewers to the Philadelphia Phillies for Dan Boitano.

Regular season 
Gorman Thomas enjoyed his best season in the majors, compiling career high numbers in home runs (45, tops in the AL), RBI (123), runs scored (97), hits (136), doubles (29), walks (98), on-base percentage (.356), total bases (300), slugging average (.539) and OPS (.895).

Season standings

Record vs. opponents

Opening Day starters 
 Sal Bando
 Mike Caldwell
 Cecil Cooper
 Larry Hisle
 Sixto Lezcano
 Don Money
 Charlie Moore
 Ben Oglivie
 Gorman Thomas
 Robin Yount

Notable transactions 
 June 7, 1979: Randy Stein was traded by the Brewers to the Seattle Mariners for Paul Mitchell.

Roster

Player stats

Batting

Starters by position 
Note: Pos = Position; G = Games played; AB = At bats; H = Hits; Avg. = Batting average; HR = Home runs; RBI = Runs batted in

Other batters 
Note: G = Games played; AB = At bats; H = Hits; Avg. = Batting average; HR = Home runs; RBI = Runs batted in

Pitching

Starting pitchers 
Note: G = Games pitched; IP = Innings pitched; W = Wins; L = Losses; ERA = Earned run average; SO = Strikeouts

Other pitchers 
Note: G = Games pitched; IP = Innings pitched; W = Wins; L = Losses; ERA = Earned run average; SO = Strikeouts

Relief pitchers 
Note: G = Games pitched; W = Wins; L = Losses; SV = Saves; ERA = Earned run average; SO = Strikeouts

Farm system

The Brewers' farm system consisted of five minor league affiliates in 1979.

Notes

References 
1979 Milwaukee Brewers at Baseball Reference
1979 Milwaukee Brewers at Baseball Almanac

Milwaukee Brewers seasons
Milwaukee Brewers season
Milwaukee Brewers